Avalon Park is an unincorporated community in Greene County, in the U.S. state of Missouri.

The community took its name from the mythological island of Avalon.

References

Unincorporated communities in Greene County, Missouri
Unincorporated communities in Missouri